Javier Sánchez Franco (born 25 January 1971), commonly known as Javi Sánchez, is a former Spanish futsal player, best known for his time with Playas de Castellón and the Spain national futsal team.

References

External links
Futsalplanet profile

1971 births
Living people
Spanish men's futsal players
Playas de Castellón FS players
People from Cáceres, Spain
Sportspeople from the Province of Cáceres